Únětice is a municipality and village in Prague-West District in the Central Bohemian Region of the Czech Republic. It has about 800 inhabitants. Únětice is the namesake of the Bronze Age Unetice culture.

Economy
The municipality is known for its small Únětice Brewery. The brewery was built in 1710 and in 1897 it was the third biggest brewery by production in the region. The beer brewing ended in 1949, but since 2011 the tradition is renewed.

References

Villages in Prague-West District